The USCGC Sockeye (WPB-87337) is the United States Coast Guard's 37th Marine Protector class cutter.
She is stationed in Bodega Bay, California.

In October 2008, Angel Island was struck by serious brush fires.  The Sockeye was assigned to coordinate the efforts of fire-fighters from a variety of agencies and local municipalities.

References

External links

Ships of the United States Coast Guard
Ships built in Lockport, Louisiana
Patrol vessels of the United States
Marine Protector-class coastal patrol boats
2001 ships